The Kyrgyzstan U-20 national football team is a youth football team operated under the Football Federation of the Kyrgyz Republic. The team represented Kyrgyzstan in the  2015 Commonwealth of Independent States Cup and 2006 AFC Youth Championship.

Current squad

AFC U-19 Championship 

u20
u20